Upton Castle was launched at Bombay in 1793. She spent her career as a "country ship", that is trading in the Far East. She made some voyages to England, including at least one, in 1809, under charter to the British East India Company (EIC). She also participated in two military campaigns as a transport. The French Navy captured her in 1804, but she returned to British hands before 1809. A fire in 1817 destroyed her.

Career
Upton Castle was built for Pestonjee Bomanjee and John Tasker, then the Master Attendant at Bombay, and was named after Tasker's Upton Castle estate in Wales. Capt. Thomas was an early master of the vessel and later one of its co-owners, and may have been the Captain William Thomas to whom Tasker left all his "charts and sea books" in 1800. John Pavin was master of the vessel by 1799 and married Tasker's great-niece in 1801. He was again master and was taken prisoner when Upton Castle was captured by the French in 1804.

Around 1800-01 Upton Castles history becomes a little ambiguous. One report has her in the Red Sea as one of the many transports supporting General Baird's expedition to help General Ralph Abercromby expel the French from Egypt. However, between 13 April and 1800 and 10 April 1801 she had traveled from Bombay to England, having arrived at Portsmouth on 10 April. She sailed from Gravesend for India on 12 June.

In December 1801, Upton Castle sailed, together with [[HMS Cornwallis (1805)|Marquis Cornwallis]], Betsey (an armed HEIC brig), some other vessels, and 1000 troops to Daman and Diu to persuade the Portuguese governor to resist any French incursion. The expedition was under the command of Captain John Mackellar, of the Royal Navy, whose own vessel, was not ready for sea. The governor accepted the British reinforcements, which, as it turned out, were not needed.

On the 18th, near the des Neoufs Channel they encountered and captured two British merchant men,  and Upton Castle. They were on their way to Bombay when Linois's squadron captured them.

Linois described Charlotte as being copper-sheathed, of 650 tons and 16 guns. She was carrying a cargo of rice. Upton Castle he described as being copper-sheathed, of 627 tons, and 14 guns. She was carrying a cargo of wheat and other products from Bengal. He sent both his prizes into Isle de France (Mauritius). She arrived at Ile de France in November, a few days prior to the 14thLloyd's List №4196.

How Charlotte and Upton Castle returned to British hands is currently obscure. Still, Charlotte was again in British hands by 1807, and Upton Castle by 1809.

On 23 July 1809 Master Hugh Adams sailed her from Bombay for England. She was at the Cape of Good Hope on 15 September, reached Saint Helena on 7 October, and arrived at The Downs pm 22 December.

The British attacked Île de France and captured it on 3 December 1810. Upton Castle was one of almost 30 transports that delivered troops and supplies for the invasion.

The British then chartered some nine vessels, Upton Castle among them, as cartels to carry back to France the French troops that they had captured. Upton Castle arrived at Morlaix on 19 March 1812.

Between 1814 and 1817 Upton Castles master was Henry W. Beyts. In 1816 and 1817 he sailed her to China.

Fate
A fire destroyed Upton Castle'' on 16 February 1817 at Saugor, near the mouth of the Ganges.

Citations

References
  
 
 
 
 

1793 ships
British ships built in India
Age of Sail merchant ships of England
Captured ships
Maritime incidents in 1817
Ship fires